Tracy Sorensen is an Australian novelist, filmmaker and academic.

Career
Sorensen is a tutor and lecturer at Charles Sturt University and has published five academic papers.

In February 2018 her debut novel The Lucky Galah was published through Pan MacMillan. It has been shortlisted and longlisted in multiple awards (see below).

In August 2019, Sorensen was awarded the Judy Harris Writer in Residence Fellowship at the University of Sydney's Charles Perkins Centre.

Personal life
Sorensen grew up in a remote area of Western Australia. She currently lives in Bathurst where she is undertaking a PhD.

Bibliography
Novels
The Lucky Galah (Pan MacMillan, 2018)

Awards
The Lucky Galah
 The UTS Glenda Adams Award for New Writing (2019 NSW Premier's Literary Awards) — Shortlisted
 The Readings Prize for New Australian Fiction (2018) — Shortlisted
 The Indie Book Award for Debut Fiction (2019) — Longlisted
 Russell Prize (2019) — Shortlisted
 Miles Franklin Award (2019) — Longlisted

References

External links
Sorensen's blog The Squawkin Galah

21st-century Australian novelists
21st-century Australian women writers
Australian women novelists
Writers from Western Australia
Academic staff of Charles Sturt University
Year of birth missing (living people)
Living people